WBOC-LD (channel 42) is a low-power television station licensed to Cambridge, Maryland, United States, serving the Salisbury, Maryland market as an affiliate of the Spanish-language Telemundo network. It is owned by the Draper Holdings Business Trust alongside dual CBS/Fox affiliate WBOC-TV (channel 16) and low-power NBC affiliate WRDE-LD (channel 31), as well as eight radio stations. Telemundo Delmarva shares studios with sister station WRDE-LD in Milton, Delaware, and WBOC-LD's transmitter is located near Laurel. WBOC-LD's programming is repeated on Salisbury-licensed WSJZ-LD (channel 34), with transmitter near Millsboro, Delaware.

History

On October 20, 2017, WBOC launched a new channel to be the area's Telemundo affiliate. In November 2017, WBOC-LD secured carriage on Delmarva area cable systems including Comcast Xfinity in Delaware and Maryland and Verizon Fios in Delaware. Also in November, a standard definition simulcast of WBOC-LD started being broadcast on WBOC-TV on channel 42.2. That simulcast ended on August 13, 2018.  In February 2018, the station began producing local news and weather updates in Spanish airing multiple times a day. The newscasts utilize the studio, graphics, music and talent of sister station WBOC-TV. Beginning in April 2019, a simulcast of WBOC-LD started being broadcast on WSJZ-LD on channel 42.3; that facility had been acquired by Draper in 2017.  In May 2019, a simulcast of WRDE-LD began being broadcast on a new subchannel. In December 2019, a simulcast of WBOC-LD's Telemundo subchannel started being broadcast on WRDE-LD. The station moved its license from Georgetown to Cambridge in 2020. In 2021, WBOC-LD moved from digital UHF channel 42 to UHF channel 22. On July 26, 2021, WBOC-TV's Antenna TV subchannel was moved to WBOC-LD and began broadcasting on channel 16.3.

Technical information

Subchannels
The station's digital signal is multiplexed:

The same channels are broadcast on WSJZ-LD, but with different minor channel numbers: 42.2, 31.4, and 16.4.

Telemundo Delmarva is also rebroadcast as channel 42.2 from WRDE-LD, which is co-sited with WBOC-LD at the Laurel tower, and WRUE-LD, broadcasting from a site northwest of Pocomoke City. WBOC Classics is broadcast as channel 16.5 from the former but not the latter.

References

External links
 
 

Television channels and stations established in 2017
2017 establishments in Delaware
Telemundo network affiliates
BOC-LD
BOC-LD
Georgetown, Delaware